Whatawhata, previously also spelt Whata Whata, is a small town in the Waikato region on the east bank of the Waipā River, at the junction of State Highways 23 and 39,  from Hamilton. Te Araroa tramping route passes through Whatawhata.

History and culture

Pre-European history
Whatawhata was a Ngāti Māhanga village and there are still Te Papa-o-Rotu and Ōmaero maraes on the west bank of the river. In early colonial times Whatawhata was one of many sites in Waikato with a flour mill. It was built in 1855 and producing flour by the end of that year.

European settlement

British troops arrived at Whatawhata over land and by river, as part of the Invasion of the Waikato, on 28 December 1863. Whatawhata was described as having no end of peach trees, which the soldiers stripped of their fruit. Within a year a telegraph line had been built.

A 1915 guide described Whatawhata as, "six miles from Frankton Junction, along a good metalled road. Coaches run to and from Frankton Junction daily, the fares being 2/- single and 3/6 return. The principal industries are farming and dairying. There is one hotel in the township, also school, and post and telegraph office. Small steamers ply up and down the river from Huntly, the waters being navigable as far up as Pirongia. Whatawhata was in the early days an important Maori centre, having at one time a native population of over a thousand."

Since then the post office has been replaced by a petrol station and dairy, the coach has become 4 per day and the river is rarely disturbed by any craft. Also the AgResearch hill-country research station at Whatawhata was started in 1949.

Across the road from AgResearch, Campbell Coal Ltd developed a coal mine in 1920, was advertising for about 10 tons a day to be carried to Hamilton in 1921 and had it fully open by 1923. It produced 9,272 tons in 1945 from a  seam, employing 6 miners and 5 surface workers. Hallyburton Johnstone said there was never a strike at the mine. The coal was sub-bituminous with a fairly high calorific value, but was largely worked out by the 1970s, when Hamilton gasworks closed. 2.9m tons is estimated to be still recoverable.

An 1880 guide said, "It is about ten miles distant from Hamilton, but a sum of money has been voted for making a direct road through a large swamp, which will bring the Hamilton station within six miles of the township. The road to Raglan crosses the, Waipā River here, and a bridge will shortly be built, when the ferry, which is now worked by natives, will be done away with. Heavy goods, such as timber, wire and manure, are brought up by the Waikato Steam Navigation Company's steamers. . . There is a convenient school in the township, where there is an average attendance of nearly forty children. The school-house and teacher's residence, erected a short time ago (1877) by the Board of Education, the settlers contributing largely towards them, are excellent buildings . . . two stores, a bakery, and comfortable hotel. Of this last Mr. G. T. M. Kellow is proprietor. He has good accommodation and stabling, and keeps excellent liquors . . . Mr,W. H. Bailey has a general store and bakery. . . convenient to the Raglan and Whatawhata bridge site. . . Mr. Day has a farm| of 1,000 acres . . . five acres in oats and the same in mangold . . . wheat thirty acres . . . a large dairy . . . pigs . . . trees are kahikatea and rimu, with a little matai . . . Whatawhata racecourse . . . runs right round the township"

A post office opened in 1868, burnt down in 1913 and was rebuilt in 1915. Electricity came to Whatawhata in 1922.

Marae

Whatawhata has two marae, affiliated with the Waikato Tainui hapū of Ngāti Māhanga and Ngāti Hourua: Ōmaero Marae and its Te Awaitaia meeting house, and Te Papa o Rotu Marae / Te Oneparepare Marae and its Papa o Rotu meeting house.

Demographics
Whatawhata settlement is part of the larger Whatawhata East statistical area.

Whatawhata settlement had a population of 303 at the 2018 New Zealand census, an increase of 33 people (12.2%) since the 2013 census, and an increase of 30 people (11.0%) since the 2006 census. There were 93 households, comprising 159 males and 150 females, giving a sex ratio of 1.06 males per female, with 81 people (26.7%) aged under 15 years, 51 (16.8%) aged 15 to 29, 147 (48.5%) aged 30 to 64, and 21 (6.9%) aged 65 or older.

Ethnicities were 77.2% European/Pākehā, 37.6% Māori, 1.0% Pacific peoples, 2.0% Asian, and 1.0% other ethnicities. People may identify with more than one ethnicity.

Although some people chose not to answer the census's question about religious affiliation, 64.4% had no religion, 22.8% were Christian, 1.0% had Māori religious beliefs, 1.0% were Muslim, 1.0% were Buddhist and 0.0% had other religions.

Of those at least 15 years old, 24 (10.8%) people had a bachelor's or higher degree, and 45 (20.3%) people had no formal qualifications. 36 people (16.2%) earned over $70,000 compared to 17.2% nationally. The employment status of those at least 15 was that 114 (51.4%) people were employed full-time, 48 (21.6%) were part-time, and 6 (2.7%) were unemployed.

Whatawhata statistical areas

The Whatawhata area had a population of 3,267 at the 2018 New Zealand census, an increase of 639 people (24.3%) since the 2013 census, and an increase of 1,032 people (46.2%) since the 2006 census. There were 1,035 households, comprising 1,668 males and 1,605 females, giving a sex ratio of 1.04 males per female, with 750 people (23.0%) aged under 15 years, 495 (15.2%) aged 15 to 29, 1,659 (50.8%) aged 30 to 64, and 363 (11.1%) aged 65 or older.

Ethnicities were 84.5% European/Pākehā, 20.8% Māori, 2.0% Pacific peoples, 2.4% Asian, and 2.0% other ethnicities. People may identify with more than one ethnicity.

The percentage of people born overseas was 12.7, compared with 27.1% nationally.

Although some people chose not to answer the census's question about religious affiliation, 54.8% had no religion, 34.8% were Christian, 1.2% had Māori religious beliefs, 0.6% were Hindu, 0.3% were Muslim, 0.4% were Buddhist and 1.4% had other religions.

Of those at least 15 years old, 510 (20.3%) people had a bachelor's or higher degree, and 417 (16.6%) people had no formal qualifications. 612 people (24.3%) earned over $70,000 compared to 17.2% nationally. The employment status of those at least 15 was that 1,449 (57.6%) people were employed full-time, 426 (16.9%) were part-time, and 72 (2.9%) were unemployed.

Education

The school opened in 1887.

References 

Waikato District
Populated places in Waikato